Atila Kelemen (born 7 May 1919 – 24 June 1994) was a Romanian water polo player. He competed in the men's tournament at the 1952 Summer Olympics.

References

1919 births
1994 deaths
Romanian male water polo players
Olympic water polo players of Romania
Water polo players at the 1952 Summer Olympics
Sportspeople from Târgu Mureș